RA3 may refer to:

 Command & Conquer: Red Alert 3, a real-time strategy video game
 Rocket Arena 3, an unofficial game modification for first-person shooter Quake III: Arena
 RA3, an ISO 217 standard paper size
 RA3, a file extension for RA3DIO Terrain Information software